Karl-Adolf Hollidt (25 April 1891 – 22 May 1985) was a German army commander and war criminal during World War II. He was a general (Generaloberst) in the Wehrmacht of Nazi Germany who commanded the 6th Army.

Career
Hollidt enlisted in the German Army in 1909. During World War I, Hollidt served on the Western Front and was awarded the Iron Cross 2nd and 1st Class. He remained in the Reichswehr (the armed forces of the Weimar Republic). Beginning in 1935, he served on the General Staff and as a chief-of-staff of an army corps in the Wehrmacht.

At the beginning of World War II, Hollidt served as commander of the 52nd Infantry Division. From 1 November 1939, he served as a Chief-of-Staff with Commander-in-Chief Ost, General Johannes Blaskowitz. From October 1940 he served as the commander of the 50th Infantry Division, participating in the German invasion of Greece. Promoted to the rank of general, Hollidt commanded XVII Army Corps, which was planned to take part in Operation Winter Storm, an attempt to relieve the 6th Army encircled at Stalingrad. After the surrender of the 6th Army, it was reconstituted in March 1943 and Hollidt was given its command. He was promoted to Generaloberst (colonel general) on 1 September 1943. In 1944, his 6th Army suffered severe losses during its retreat from the Dnieper. Hollidt was dismissed from his command and put into reserve.

Trial and conviction
In 1945, Hollidt was taken prisoner by US forces. At the High Command Trial held at Nuremberg, he was convicted of the unlawful use of prisoners of war and of the deportation and enslavement of civilians. He was sentenced to five years imprisonment, and was released on good time credit on 21 December 1949. He died in 1985.

Awards
 Iron Cross (1914) 2nd Class (9 September 1914) & 1st Class (18 October 1916)
 Clasp to the Iron Cross (1939) 2nd Class (30 May 1940) & 1st Class (7 June 1940)
 Knight's Cross of the Iron Cross with Oak Leaves
 Knight's Cross on 8 September 1941 as commander of the 50th Infantry Division
 239th Oak Leaves on 17 May 1943 as commander of 6th Army

References

Citations

Bibliography

External links
 

1891 births
1985 deaths
German Army personnel of World War I
People from Speyer
Colonel generals of the German Army (Wehrmacht)
Recipients of the clasp to the Iron Cross, 1st class
Recipients of the Knight's Cross of the Iron Cross with Oak Leaves
People from the Kingdom of Bavaria
German prisoners of war in World War II held by the United States
German people convicted of crimes against humanity
German people convicted of war crimes
People convicted by the United States Nuremberg Military Tribunals
Reichswehr personnel
20th-century Freikorps personnel
Military personnel from Rhineland-Palatinate
German Army generals of World War II